Simple Energy is a privately held software-as-a-service (SaaS) company.

Simple Energy is headquartered in Boulder, Colorado.

History
Simple Energy was founded in 2010 by longtime friends Yoav Lurie and Justin Segall, classmates at Duke University. The two had met on a backpacking trip in Pisgah National Forest in 2000.

Green Button
In September 2011, then-US CTO Aneesh Chopra challenged the energy industry to model a Green Button, off the successful Blue Button, where energy providers would give energy users their consumption data in an easy to read and use format at the click of the button. In January 2012, Simple Energy became the first third-party application developer to implement the Green Button standard to deploy publicly available applications.

Awards and highlights
In February 2015, Simple Energy was named Metro Denver's Healthiest Employer (small companies) by the Denver Business Journal.
 In November 2014, Simple Energy was named one of the "Top 100 Digital Employers" in Colorado Built In Colorado  
 In November 2014, Simple Energy was listed on Global Cleantech 100’s Ones to Watch list by Cleantech Group 
 In July 2012, Simple Energy Founders Yoav Lurie and Justin Segall were named to Inc. Magazine's "30 Under 30" list of the top 30 entrepreneurs under 30 years old.
 In June 2012, Simple Energy was named to Bloomberg BusinessWeek list of America's Most Promising Social Entrepreneurs.
 Simple Energy graduated from the Techstars startup accelerator program in August 2011.
 In August 2011, Simple Energy was named one of "Eight Startups Changing the World" by Mashable

See also
 Energy management software
 Smart grid
 Clean technology

References 

Software companies based in Colorado
Environmental technology
Sustainable technologies
Energy conservation in the United States
Companies based in Boulder, Colorado
American companies established in 2010
Energy companies established in 2010
Renewable resource companies established in 2010
Software companies established in 2010
2010 establishments in Colorado
Software companies of the United States